Lago Brown Airport  is an airstrip at the western end of Lago Brown (es), a mountain lake in the Aysén Region of Chile that runs along the border with Argentina.

The unmarked runway is on alluvial ground at the base of a mountain wall. The mountain is adjacent to the north, with open valley to the south. The valley narrows to the west, and the lake is to the east.

Published airstrip elevation differs from the Google Earth digital elevation model, which has the elevation much higher, at  midfield.

See also

Transport in Chile
List of airports in Chile

References

External links
OpenStreetMap - Lago Brown
OurAirports - Lago Brown
FallingRain - Lago Brown Airport

Airports in Aysén Region